Hotel Nobis Copenhagen is an upscale hotel in central Copenhagen, Denmark.

History
The building was constructed for the Royal Danish Academy of Music in 1903. It was designed by Martin Borch who served as Royal Building Inspector from 1903 to 1923. The Royal Music Academy relocated to Radiohuset in 2008. The building was acquired by the Swedish property company Balder in 2015. The architectural firm AI was subsequently responsible for adapting it for use as a hotel. Nobis Hotel Copenhagen opened in 2017.

Today
Wingårdhs has been in charge of interior design.

References

External links
 Nobis Hotel Copenhagen

Hotels in Copenhagen
National Romantic architecture in Copenhagen
Hotel buildings completed in 1903